Ajay Bhattacharyya, known professionally as Stint, is a Canadian record producer and songwriter. He has produced songs for Gallant, MØ, Carly Rae Jepsen, Demi Lovato, NAO and Zara Larsson.

Career 
Stint was born and raised in Victoria, British Columbia. He attended Vancouver Film School, where he studied sound design. He is best known for his work with Gallant, producing and co-writing the majority of his debut album, Ology which was nominated for Best Urban Contemporary Album at the 2017 Grammy Awards. He has produced for NAO, Banks, Santigold, AlunaGeorge, Carly Rae Jepsen, among others. He has also released remixes of artists such as Q-Tip, Lana Del Rey, Kent Jones, and Young The Giant. His remix for West Coast peaked at number 1 on Hype Machine.

Discography

Songwriting and production credits

Remixes 

 FRENSHIP & Emily Warren – "Capsize (Stint Remix)"
 Sebell – "Promiseland (Stint Remix)"
 Nila – "Body (Stint Remix)"
 Christina Perri – "Burning Gold (Stint Remix)"
 Young The Giant – "Mind Over Matter (Stint Remix)"
 Lana Del Rey – "West Coast (Stint Remix)"
 Radiohead – "Nude (Stint Remix)"
 Q-Tip – "Work It Out (Stint Remix)"
 The Belle Game – "Wait Up For You (Stint Remix)"

References

External links 

Canadian record producers
Canadian songwriters
Living people
Writers from Victoria, British Columbia
Year of birth missing (living people)